José Pérez Reyes (born 1975-06-19) is a male boxer from the Dominican Republic, who competed for his native country at the 1996 Summer Olympics in Atlanta, Georgia. There he was stopped in the second round of the men's light flyweight division by Romania's Sabin Bornei.

References
 sports-reference

1975 births
Living people
Flyweight boxers
Boxers at the 1996 Summer Olympics
Olympic boxers of the Dominican Republic
Dominican Republic male boxers